Veveo is a software company based in Andover, Massachusetts.

Founded in 2004, Veveo's customers include Comcast, Cablevision, Rogers, AT&T, DirecTV, and Nokia. The venture-backed company is based near Boston, Massachusetts, and has an intellectual property portfolio of fifty (issued or allowed) patents and 80 patent applications. 

On February 25, 2014, Veveo was acquired by Rovi Corporation.

Conversational interfaces
Veveo's developments in natural language processing and understanding enabled dialog-based real-time conversational interfaces was introduced in late 2012. These interfaces allow connected devices and applications to be used with natural conversational intelligence applied to voice interfaces. As a result, users can talk to devices with normal language and devices can respond with natural language responses.

References

Semantic Web
Mobile technology
Software companies based in Massachusetts
Companies established in 2004
Defunct software companies of the United States
2004 establishments in the United States
2004 establishments in Massachusetts
Software companies established in 2004